The Mid Murray Council is a local government area in South Australia in the Murray and Mallee region of South Australia. The council spans the area from the Riverland through the Murraylands to the eastern slopes of the Mount Lofty Ranges. It includes 220 km of the Murray River. The council seat is at Mannum; it also maintains secondary offices at Cambrai and Morgan.

It was formed on 1 July 1997 from the amalgamation of the District Council of Mannum, the District Council of Morgan, the District Council of Ridley-Truro and part of the District Council of Mount Pleasant.

Geography

The council's main centres include the river towns of Mannum, Swan Reach, Blanchetown and Morgan and the hills towns of Truro, Palmer and Tungkillo. It also includes a large number of rural localities, including Angas Valley, Annadale, Apamurra, Beatty, Beaumonts, Big Bend, Bolto, Brenda Park, Cadell, Cadell Lagoon, Cambrai, Caurnamont, Claypans, Cowirra, Dutton East, Eba, Fisher, Five Miles, Forster, Frahns, Frayville, Julanka Holdings, Keyneton, Lake Carlet, Langs Landing, Lindley, Maude, Marks Landing, McBean Pound, Morphetts Flat, Mount Mary, Milendella, Nildottie, North West Bend, Old Teal Flat, Pellaring Flat, Pompoota, Ponde, Port Mannum, Punthari, Punyelroo, Purnong, Rocky Point, Sanderston, Sandleton, Sedan, Stuart, Sunnydale, Teal Flat, Towitta, Walker Flat, Wombats Rest, Wongulla, Younghusband, Younghusband Holdings and Zadows Landing, and parts of Birdwood, Bower, Bowhill, Brownlow, Burdett, Caloote, Dutton, Eden Valley, Frankton, Mount Pleasant, Mount Torrens, Murbko, Rockleigh, Springton, Steinfeld, Taylorville, Tepko and Wall Flat.

Councillors

Mid Murray Council has a directly-elected mayor.

References

External links
Official website

Local government areas of South Australia